Robert Davis Carey (August 12, 1878January 17, 1937) was an American politician from Wyoming, a state of which he served as Governor and represented in the United States Senate. He was the first native-born Wyomingite to serve in either position. He was a member of the Republican Party.

Biography

Robert Carey was born on August 12, 1878, to Joseph Maull Carey and Louisa David in Cheyenne in the Wyoming Territory. He attended and received an education from the public schools and Hill School in Pottstown, Pennsylvania. Carey attended college and graduated from Yale University in 1900, after which he moved to Converse County, Wyoming. Once back in Wyoming, Carey entered the livestock and agricultural businesses and took an interest in banking. He served as a member of the Progressive National Committee for Wyoming from 1912 to 1916 and chairman of the Wyoming State Highway Commission from 1917 to 1918. Carey also served as president of the Wyoming Stock Grower's Association between 1917 and 1921.

In 1918, Carey was elected the 11th Governor of Wyoming, serving from 1919 to 1923. He was Wyoming's first governor to be born in the state. He was appointed by President Calvin Coolidge in 1924 to evaluate agriculture in the United States as chairman of the agricultural conference.

Carey was elected to represent Wyoming as a Republican in the United States Senate on November 4, 1930, to fill a vacancy created by the death of Francis E. Warren and was also elected in his own right to the term commencing in March 1931. He assumed office on December 1, 1930, and served until the expiration of his term on January 3, 1937. He unsuccessfully sought reelection in 1936.

Upon the expiration of his term in the United States Senate, Carey returned to Wyoming to reenter the agricultural business. He died on January 17, 1937, two weeks after he left office, in Cheyenne. He was interred in Lakeview Cemetery.

References

External links

Robert D. Carey at the Wyoming State Archives
 Carey Family Papers at the University of Wyoming - American Heritage Center

1878 births
1937 deaths
Politicians from Cheyenne, Wyoming
American people of English descent
American Episcopalians
Republican Party United States senators from Wyoming
Republican Party governors of Wyoming
The Hill School alumni